Courtney Cramey (born 28 November 1985) is a former Australian rules footballer who played 20 matches over four seasons at the Adelaide Football Club in the AFL Women's competition. She was a two-time premiership player and a one-time All-Australian.

Cramey was one of 5 judges for the 2021 A.F.L.W. Grand Final best on ground award, and the only judge not to give any votes to the winner Kate Lutkins who polled 12 out of 15 votes.

Early life and state league football
Cramey played football throughout primary school as the only girl in teams that were otherwise all boys. In high school, she turned to basketball due to the lack of girls' football teams.

Cramey began playing women's football in 2004 with Sturt Football Club in the South Australian Women's Football League (SAWFL). She later played with Morphettville Park, where she mentored future fellow Adelaide Crow and AFLW all-Australian Ebony Marinoff. Cramey was best on ground and team captain in Morphettville Parks' first women's division 1 premiership, in 2014. She captained the team to second and third successive premierships in 2015 and 2016.

AFL Women's career
Cramey was a priority selection by  before the 2016 AFL Women's draft. She made her debut in the club's inaugural match, in round one 2017 against , listed to start as centre. As well as center, Cramey was listed to start as a forward, a defender and as a rover over the course of the season.

Cramey suffered a concussion in round seven, but participated in team practice the following week. She recovered to play her best game of the season in the inaugural AFLW Premiership, recording 23 disposals, second only to Erin Phillips. After the season, Cramey was listed in the All-Australian team.

Adelaide signed Cramey for the 2018 season during the trade period in May 2017. She missed the first three rounds of the season due to a hamstring injury but returned for round four to bolster the Crows' defence. After 20 games over four seasons, Cramey retired at the end of the 2020 season.

Personal life
Cramey is a social worker, employed by the South Australian correctional services department as a principal advisor for parolees and people in Community Based Corrections.

Statistics

|- style="background-color: #EAEAEA"
! scope="row" style="text-align:center" | 2017
|
| 22 || 8 || 0 || 2 || 60 || 10 || 70 || 16 || 19 || 0.0 || 0.3 || 7.5 || 1.3 || 8.8 || 2.0 || 2.4
|- 
! scope="row" style="text-align:center" | 2018
|style="text-align:center;"|
| 22 || 4 || 1 || 1 || 36 || 3 || 39 || 10 || 9 || 0.3 || 0.3 || 9.0 || 2.5 || 9.8 || 2.5 || 2.3
|- style="background-color: #EAEAEA"
! scope="row" style="text-align:center" | 2019
|style="text-align:center;"|
| 22 || 7 || 1 || 0 || 56 || 25 || 81 || 13 || 25 || 0.1 || 0.0 || 8.0 || 3.6 || 11.6 || 1.9 || 3.6
|-
! scope="row" style="text-align:center" | 2020
|style="text-align:center;"|
| 22 || 1 || 0 || 0 || 5 || 0 || 5 || 0 || 2 || 0.0 || 0.0 || 5.0 || 0.0 || 5.0 || 0.0 || 2.0
|- class="sortbottom"
! colspan=3| Career
! 20
! 2
! 3
! 157
! 38
! 195
! 39
! 55
! 0.1
! 0.2
! 7.9
! 1.9
! 9.8
! 2.0
! 2.8
|}

References

External links

Living people
1985 births
Adelaide Football Club (AFLW) players
Australian rules footballers from South Australia
All-Australians (AFL Women's)
Australian social workers
Lesbian sportswomen
Australian LGBT sportspeople
LGBT players of Australian rules football
21st-century Australian LGBT people